Lautaro Rinaldi (born 30 December 1993) is an Argentine footballer who plays as a forward for WSG Tirol. He also holds Italian citizenship.

Club career 

Rinaldi is a youth exponent from Argentinos Juniors. He made his league debut at 15 February 2015 against Atlético Rafaela in a 2-0 home win. He replaced Gonzalo Castillejos after 65 minutes.
On 25 July 2016, Panathinaikos is eager to sign with the Argentinial striker. According to "tuttob.com" Italian website, Argentinos Juniors' striker rejected Hellas Verona's transfer bid because of Panathinaikos. Technical director of the Greens, Gilberto Silva, is eager to sign the 23-year-old Argentine and it seems that Lautaro Rinaldi also prefers to continue his career at Greek Super League. Eventually, on 5 August 2016 the young Argentine striker has been signed from Argentine club Argentinos Juniors who were relegated to the second tier in Argentina on a four-year contract for a fee of €300,000. However, despite the big prospects could not find a regular place in the squad and the Argentinian striker has been considering a move as a loan, to either MLS or Qatar in the summer transfer window.
On 31 August 2017, he signed with Serie B club Brescia.
On 20 June 2022, he joined Austrian Bundesliga club WSG Tirol.

References

1993 births
Sportspeople from Buenos Aires Province
Argentine people of Italian descent
Living people
Argentine footballers
Association football forwards
Argentinos Juniors footballers
Panathinaikos F.C. players
Brescia Calcio players
C.D. Veracruz footballers
Club Deportivo Universidad de San Martín de Porres players
Club Atlético Temperley footballers
Aldosivi footballers
WSG Tirol players
Argentine Primera División players
Primera Nacional players
Super League Greece players
Serie B players
Peruvian Primera División players
Austrian Football Bundesliga players
Argentine expatriate footballers
Argentine expatriate sportspeople in Mexico
Expatriate footballers in Mexico
Argentine expatriate sportspeople in Greece
Expatriate footballers in Greece
Argentine expatriate sportspeople in Italy
Expatriate footballers in Italy
Argentine expatriate sportspeople in Peru
Expatriate footballers in Peru
Argentine expatriate sportspeople in Austria
Expatriate footballers in Austria